Trevor John Harris (born 6 February 1936) is an English former professional footballer who played as a wing half in The Football League.

Career
Born in Colchester, England, Harris made 99 appearances for hometown club Colchester United, helping the team to the promotion to the Third Division in the  1961–62 season. He left the U's in 1963 to play non-league football for Chelmsford City.

Honours

Club
Colchester United
 Football League Fourth Division Runner-up (1): 1961–62

References

External links
 
 Trevor Harris at Colchester United Archive Database

1936 births
Living people
Sportspeople from Colchester
English footballers
Association football defenders
Colchester United F.C. players
Chelmsford City F.C. players